The Cherry Avenue Bridge (North Avenue railroad bridge, or Chicago, Milwaukee & St. Paul Railway, Bridge No. Z-2) is an asymmetric bob-tail swing bridge in Chicago, Illinois that carries the Chicago Terminal Railroad, pedestrians, and cyclists across the North Branch Canal of the Chicago River. It was constructed in 1901–02 by the Chicago, Milwaukee and St. Paul Railway, and it is a rare example of this type of bridge; it was designated a Chicago Landmark on December 12, 2007.

Location

History

Goose Island is a man-made island on the north branch of the Chicago River that was formed in the 1850s by the digging of the North Branch Canal. In 1871 the Chicago and Pacific Railroad started construction of a railroad from Goose Island through Elgin, Illinois to Byron, Illinois. This company was absorbed into the Chicago, Milwaukee and St. Paul Railway in 1880. The Cherry Avenue bridge was constructed in 1901–02 by the Chicago, Milwaukee and St. Paul to replace a 20-year-old bridge on the same location. It spans the North Branch Canal of the Chicago River providing the only railroad access to Goose Island. 

Railroad operation on Goose Island was taken over by the Soo Line Railroad in 1986, and then by the Chicago Terminal Railroad in January 2007. The bridge was purchased by the City of Chicago in 2008, and restored in 2008–09 adding new decking and lights to enable safe pedestrian access.

Structure

The bridge is one of two bob-tail swing bridges constructed by the Chicago, Milwaukee & St. Paul Railway on the North Branch of the Chicago River. The bridge is no longer operable, but when constructed it was able to swing to the east, to an angle of 82.5˚ when parallel to the dock wall. The bridge was designed to carry a single railroad track, but also may originally have been intended for use by other vehicular traffic on Cherry Avenue. A sidewalk is cantilevered from the east side of the bridge.

See also
List of bridges documented by the Historic American Engineering Record in Illinois

References

External links

Bridges completed in 1902
Bridges in Chicago
Chicago, Milwaukee, St. Paul and Pacific Railroad
Historic American Engineering Record in Chicago
Chicago Landmarks
Railroad bridges in Illinois
Swing bridges in the United States
Pratt truss bridges in the United States
Metal bridges in the United States